Out Here All Night is the second album by rock band Damone. The title track has been featured in several video games, including Madden NFL 07, Tony Hawk's Downhill Jam, WWE Diva Search, and the Rock Band series as downloadable content. "What We Came Here For" appears in ATV Offroad Fury 4.

Track listing
All songs written by Mike Woods.
 Now Is the Time
 Out Here All Night
 What We Came Here For
 Stabbed in the Heart
 On Your Speakers
 Get Up and Go
 Outta My Way
 You're the One
 New Change of Heart
 When You Live
 Tonight
 Wasted Years (Iron Maiden cover)

Personnel
Damone
 Noelle LeBlanc – lead vocals, guitar
 Dustin Hengst – drums, backing vocals
 Michael Vazquez – bass guitar, backing vocals
 Mike Woods – lead guitar, backing vocals

Production
 Damone – producer
 David Spreng – producer, engineer, mixing for track 12, programming, additional talking on track 7
 Tom Lord-Alge – mixing for tracks 2, 3, 4, 7, 10, and 11
 Mike Shipley – mixing for tracks 1, 5, 6, 8, and 9
 Bob Ludwig – mastering
 Scott Gilman – orchestrations, mixing for track 12
 Mudrock – additional editing on track 2

Additional personnel
 Thicker Bradshall – additional backing vocals on track 6
 Michael Gill – additional talking on track 7
 Amanda Whitmore – additional talking on track 7

References

2006 albums
Damone (band) albums
Island Records albums